Marc Christopher Rosenberg (born 10 February 1982 in Johannesburg, South Africa) is a South African cricketer who played first-class cricket for Leicestershire.

Rosenberg has also played first-class games for Loughborough UCCE, for North West in South Africa, and, in 2009, for the Cambridge University Centre of Cricketing Excellence. He graduated from Loughborough University in 2004.

Rosenberg was a talented all rounder who never fulfilled his full potential. He was talked about in many circles as an up-and-coming leader on the County circuit with some promising performances showing glimpses of his raw talent.

Post his professional career Rosenberg completed his Post Graduate Studies at Cambridge University where he played for the Blues in Golf, Rugby and Cricket. His man of the match performance in The Blues Match at Lords was a fitting last hurrah in his short career.

A talented sportsman that is now excelling in the business world.

References

External links
Cricinfo Profile

1982 births
Alumni of Loughborough University
Cambridge MCCU cricketers
English cricketers
English sportspeople of South African descent
Leicestershire cricketers
Living people
Loughborough MCCU cricketers
North West cricketers